The Chess Box is a compact disc box set compilation by Chuck Berry. It is one in a series of box sets issued by MCA/Chess in the late 1980s (the other sets were by Bo Diddley, Howlin' Wolf, Muddy Waters, Willie Dixon, and Etta James). The Chuck Berry set is the most prominent of these, having won a Grammy Award for Best Historical Album in 1989. Berry's Chess Box was reissued on vinyl in 1990.

This collection was also issued on audio cassette.

Songs 
The songs "I'm Just a Lucky So and So" and "Time Was" were previously unreleased. "Cryin' Steel" was first released as "Surfin' Steel" on Chuck Berry on Stage. "Ramona Say Yes" did not have saxophones.

Another song of interest is "Chuck's Beat", from the album Two Great Guitars, by Berry and Bo Diddley.

Track listing 
All songs written by Chuck Berry except as noted

Disc 1 
 "Maybellene" (2:18)
 "Wee Wee Hours" (2:02)
 "Thirty Days" (2:21)
 "You Can't Catch Me" (2:42)
 "No Money Down" (2:56)
 "Downbound Train" (2:49)
 "Brown Eyed Handsome Man" (2:15)
 "Drifting Heart" (2:47)
 "Roll Over Beethoven" (2:22)
 "Too Much Monkey Business" (2:53)
 "Havana Moon" (3:06)
 "School Days" (2:40)
 "Rock and Roll Music" (2:30)
 "Oh Baby Doll" (2:36)
 "I've Changed" (3:04)
 "Reelin' and Rockin'" (3:15)
 "Rockin' at the Philharmonic" (3:21)
 "Sweet Little Sixteen" (3:10)
 "Johnny B. Goode" (2:37)
 "Time Was" (Gabriel Luna, Miguel Prado, Bob Russell) (1:56)
 "Around and Around" (2:38)
 "Beautiful Delilah" (2:13)
 "House of Blue Lights" (Don Raye, Freddie Slack) (2:24)
 "Carol" (2:46)

Disc 2 
 "Memphis, Tennessee" (2:10)
 "Anthony Boy" (1:52)
 "Jo Jo Gunne" (2:45)
 "Sweet Little Rock N' Roller" (2:20)
 "Merry Christmas Baby" (Lou Baxter, Johnny Moore) (3:11)
 "Run Rudolph Run" (Marvin Brodie, Johnny Marks) (2:43)
 "Little Queenie" (2:40)
 "Almost Grown" (2:18)
 "Back in the U.S.A." (2:27)
 "Betty Jean" (2:29)
 "Childhood Sweetheart" (2:42)
 "Let It Rock" (1:45)
 "Too Pooped to Pop" (Billie Davis) (2:33)
 "Bye Bye Johnny" (2:03)
 "Jaguar and Thunderbird" (1:50)
 "Down the Road a Piece" (Raye) (2:13)
 "Confessin' the Blues" (Walter Brown, Jay McShann) (2:07)
 "Thirteen Question Method" (2:12)
 "Crying Steel" (2:32)
 "I'm Just a Lucky So-and-So" (Mack David, Duke Ellington) (2:50)
 "I'm Talking About You" (1:48)
 "Come On" (1:48)
 "Nadine (Is It You?)" (Berry, Alan Freed) (2:35)
 "Crazy Arms" (Ralph Mooney, Chuck Seals) (2:12)
 "You Never Can Tell" (2:40)
 "The Things I Used To Do" (Guitar Slim) (2:40)
 "Promised Land" (2:20)

Disc 3 
 "No Particular Place to Go" (2:41)
 "Liverpool Drive" (2:53)
 "You Two" (2:08)
 "Chuck's Beat" (Berry, Bo Diddley) (10:35)
 "Little Marie" (2:34)
 "Dear Dad" (1:48)
 "Sad Day Long Night" (2:42)
 "It's My Own Business" (2:10)
 "It Wasn't Me" (2:32)
 "Ramona Say Yes" (2:40)
 "Viva Viva Rock N' Roll" (2:00)
 "Tulane" (2:36)
 "Have Mercy Judge" (2:38)
 "My Dream" (5:56)
 "Reelin' and Rockin'", live recording (7:02)
 "My Ding-a-Ling", live single-edit (4:16)
 "Johnny B. Goode", live recording (3:13)
 "A Deuce" (2:32)
 "Woodpecker" (3:33)
 "Bio" (4:22)

Personnel 
Performers

 Chuck Berry – lead vocals, guitar, piano
 Owen McIntyre – guitar
 Matt "Guitar" Murphy – guitar
 Billy Peek – guitar
 Jimmy Rogers – guitar
 Bo Diddley – guitar
 Stan Bronstein – saxophone
 L.C. Davis – tenor saxophone
 Adam Ippolito – piano
 Johnnie Johnson – piano
 Dave Kafinetti – piano
 Lafayette Leake – piano
 Otis Spann – piano
 Paul Williams – piano
 Jerome Green – maracas
 Chuck Bernard – bass guitar
 Willie Dixon – bass
 Jack "Zocko" Groendal – bass guitar
 Nic Potter – bass guitar
 George "Harmonica" Smith – bass
 Gary VanScyoc – bass guitar
 Fred Below – drums
 Rick Frank – drums
 Eddie Hardy – drums
 Robbie McIntosh – drums
 Bill Metros – drums
 Odie Payne – drums
 Jasper Thomas – drums
 Martha Berry – backing vocals

Production
 Leonard Chess – producer
 Phil Chess – producer
 Chuck Berry – producer
 Esmond Edwards – producer
 Billy Altman – liner notes
 Andy McKaie – reissue production,  compilation production
 Greg Fulginiti – mastering
 Doug Schwartz – digital transfer

Charts

References 

Chuck Berry compilation albums
1988 compilation albums
Albums produced by Leonard Chess
Albums produced by Phil Chess
Albums produced by Esmond Edwards
Chess Records compilation albums